Ernie Walley (born 7 April 1933 in Caernarfon) is a retired association football player, manager and coach.

Playing career
Walley joined Tottenham Hotspur as a junior in May 1951, making five league appearances as a wing half before moving to Middlesbrough in 1958. After eight appearances for Middlesbrough he moved again to Crystal Palace, but failed to make a first team appearance before moving to Gravesend & Northfleet and subsequently Stevenage Borough.

Coaching and managerial career
After retiring as a player Walley spent eight years as a coach at Arsenal before joining Crystal Palace in the same capacity in 1967. He became caretaker manager of Crystal Palace for six matches following the departure of Terry Venables in 1980. After the appointments of Malcolm Allison and subsequently Dario Gradi, Walley continued as a coach at Crystal Palace. He was later assistant manager to John Hollins at Chelsea during the mid-1980s, and reserve manager under Steve Harrison at Watford. His brother Tom played for Watford and Wales, and was a coach at Watford at the same time as Ernie. Ernie Walley subsequently managed Barking between December 1983 until January 1985, and later Bangor City for a short spell in 1992.

References

External links

1933 births
Living people
People from Caernarfon
Sportspeople from Gwynedd
Tottenham Hotspur F.C. players
Middlesbrough F.C. players
Welsh footballers
Welsh football managers
Arsenal F.C. non-playing staff
Crystal Palace F.C. non-playing staff
Crystal Palace F.C. managers
Chelsea F.C. non-playing staff
Watford F.C. non-playing staff
Barking F.C. managers
Bangor City F.C. managers
Cymru Premier managers
Association football wing halves